The Mughal Empire was an early-modern empire that controlled much of South Asia between the 16th and 19th centuries. For some two hundred years, the empire stretched from the outer fringes of the Indus river basin in the west, northern Afghanistan in the northwest, and Kashmir in the north, to the highlands of present-day Assam and Bangladesh in the east, and the uplands of the Deccan Plateau in South India.

The Mughal empire is conventionally said to have been founded in 1526 by Babur, a warrior chieftain from what is today Uzbekistan, who employed aid from the neighboring Safavid and Ottoman empires, to defeat the Sultan of Delhi, Ibrahim Lodi, in the First Battle of Panipat, and to sweep down the plains of North India. The Mughal imperial structure, however, is sometimes dated to 1600, to the rule of Babur's grandson, Akbar. This imperial structure lasted until 1720, shortly after the death of the last major emperor, Aurangzeb, during whose reign the empire also achieved its maximum geographical extent. Reduced subsequently to the region in and around Old Delhi by 1760, the empire was formally dissolved by the British Raj after the Indian Rebellion of 1857.

Although the Mughal empire was created and sustained by military warfare, it did not vigorously suppress the cultures and peoples it came to rule; rather it equalized and placated them through new administrative practices and diverse ruling elites, leading to more efficient, centralised, and standardized rule. The base of the empire's collective wealth was agricultural taxes, instituted by the third Mughal emperor, Akbar. These taxes, which amounted to well over half the output of a peasant cultivator, were paid in the well-regulated silver currency, and caused peasants and artisans to enter larger markets.

The relative peace maintained by the empire during much of the 17th century was a factor in India's economic expansion. The burgeoning European presence in the Indian Ocean, and its increasing demand for Indian raw and finished products, created still greater wealth in the Mughal courts. There was more conspicuous consumption among the Mughal elite, resulting in greater patronage of painting, literary forms, textiles, and architecture, especially during the reign of Shah Jahan. Among the Mughal UNESCO World Heritage Sites in South Asia are: Agra Fort, Fatehpur Sikri, Red Fort, Humayun's Tomb, Lahore Fort, Shalamar Gardens, and the Taj Mahal, which is described as "the jewel of Muslim art in India, and one of the universally admired masterpieces of the world's heritage."

Name 
Contemporaries referred to the empire founded by Babur as the Timurid Empire, which reflected the heritage of his dynasty, and this was the term preferred by the Mughals themselves.

The Mughal designation for their own dynasty was Gurkani. The use of "Mughal" and "Moghul" derived from the Arabic and Persian corruption of "Mongol", and it emphasised the Mongol origins of the Timurid dynasty. The term gained currency during the 19th century, but remains disputed by Indologists. Similar transliterations had been used to refer to the empire, including "Mogul" and "Moghul". Nevertheless, Babur's ancestors were sharply distinguished from the classical Mongols insofar as they were oriented towards Persian rather than Turco-Mongol culture. The Mughals themselves claimed ultimate descent from Mongol Empire founder Genghis Khan.

Another name for the empire was Hindustan, which was documented in the Ain-i-Akbari, and which has been described as the closest to an official name for the empire. Mughal administrative records also refer to the empire as "Sultanate of the Country of Delhi", or "The Protected Countries of Hindustan". In the west, the term "Mughal" was used for the emperor, and by extension, the empire as a whole.

History

Babur and Humayun (1526–1556)

The Mughal Empire was founded by Babur (reigned 1526–1530), a Central Asian ruler who was descended from the Turco-Mongol conqueror Timur (the founder of the Timurid Empire) on his father's side, and from Genghis Khan on his mother's side. Paternally, Babur belonged to the Turkicized Barlas tribe of Mongol origin. Ousted from his ancestral domains in Central Asia, Babur turned to India to satisfy his ambitions.
He established himself in Kabul and then pushed steadily southward into India from Afghanistan through the Khyber Pass. Babur's forces defeated Ibrahim Lodi in the First Battle of Panipat in 1526. Before the battle, Babur sought divine favour by abjuring liquor, breaking the wine vessels and pouring the wine down a well.
However, by this time Lodi's empire was already crumbling, and it was actually the Rajput Confederacy which was the strongest power of Northern India under the capable rule of Rana Sanga of Mewar. He defeated Babar in the Battle of Bayana. However, in the decisive Battle of Khanwa which was fought near Agra, the Timurid forces of Babur defeated the Rajput army of Sanga. This battle was one of the most decisive and historic battles in Indian history, as it sealed the fate of Northern India for the next two centuries.

After the battle, the centre of Mughal power became Agra instead of Kabul. The preoccupation with wars and military campaigns, however, did not allow the new emperor to consolidate the gains he had made in India. The instability of the empire became evident under his son, Humayun (reigned 1530–1556), who was forced into exile in Persia by rebels. The Sur Empire (1540–1555), founded by Sher Shah Suri (reigned 1540–1545), briefly interrupted Mughal rule. Humayun's exile in Persia established diplomatic ties between the Safavid and Mughal Courts, and led to increasing Persian cultural influence in the later restored Mughal Empire. Humayun's triumphant return from Persia in 1555 restored Mughal rule in some parts of India, but he died in an accident the next year.

Akbar to Aurangzeb (1556–1707)

Akbar (reigned 1556–1605) was born Jalal-ud-din Muhammad in the Rajput Umarkot Fort, to Humayun and his wife Hamida Banu Begum, a Persian princess. Akbar succeeded to the throne under a regent, Bairam Khan, who helped consolidate the Mughal Empire in India. Through warfare and diplomacy, Akbar was able to extend the empire in all directions and controlled almost the entire Indian subcontinent north of the Godavari River. He created a new ruling elite loyal to him, implemented a modern administration, and encouraged cultural developments. He increased trade with European trading companies. India developed a strong and stable economy, leading to commercial expansion and economic development. Akbar allowed freedom of religion at his court, and attempted to resolve socio-political and cultural differences in his empire by establishing a new religion, Din-i-Ilahi, with strong characteristics of a ruler cult. He left his son an internally stable state, which was in the midst of its golden age, but before long signs of political weakness would emerge.

Jahangir (born Salim, reigned 1605–1627) was born to Akbar and his wife Mariam-uz-Zamani, an Indian Rajput princess. Salim was named after the Indian Sufi saint, Salim Chishti and was raised by the daughter of Chishti. He "was addicted to opium, neglected the affairs of the state, and came under the influence of rival court cliques". Jahangir distinguished himself from Akbar by making substantial efforts to gain the support of the Islamic religious establishment. One way he did this was by bestowing many more madad-i-ma'ash (tax-free personal land revenue grants given to religiously learned or spiritually worthy individuals) than Akbar had. In contrast to Akbar, Jahangir came into conflict with non-Muslim religious leaders, notably the Sikh guru Arjan, whose execution was the first of many conflicts between the Mughal empire and the Sikh community.

Shah Jahan (reigned 1628–1658) was born to Jahangir and his wife Jagat Gosain, a Rajput princess. His reign ushered in the golden age of Mughal architecture. During the reign of Shah Jahan, the splendour of the Mughal court reached its peak, as exemplified by the Taj Mahal.The cost of maintaining the court, however, began to exceed the revenue coming in. His reign was called as "The Golden Age of Mughal Architecture". Shah Jahan extended the Mughal empire to the Deccan by ending the Nizam Shahi dynasty, and forced the Adil Shahis and Qutb Shahis to pay tribute.

Shah Jahan's eldest son, the liberal Dara Shikoh, became regent in 1658, as a result of his father's illness. Dara championed a syncretistic Hindu-Muslim culture, emulating his great-grandfather Akbar. With the support of the Islamic orthodoxy, however, a younger son of Shah Jahan, Aurangzeb, seized the throne. Aurangzeb defeated Dara in 1659 and had him executed. Although Shah Jahan fully recovered from his illness, Aurangzeb kept Shah Jahan imprisoned until his death in 1666. Aurangzeb oversaw an increase in the Islamicization of the Mughal state. He encouraged conversion to Islam, reinstated the jizya on non-Muslims, and compiled the Fatawa 'Alamgiri, a collection of Islamic law. Aurangzeb also ordered the execution of the Sikh guru Tegh Bahadur, leading to the militarization of the Sikh community. From the imperial perspective, conversion to Islam integrated local elites into the king's vision of network of shared identity that would join disparate groups throughout the empire in obedience to the Mughal emperor. He expanded the empire to include almost the whole of South Asia, but at his death in 1707, "many parts of the empire were in open revolt". Aurangzeb is considered India's most controversial king, with some historians arguing his religious conservatism and intolerance undermined the stability of Mughal society, while other historians question this, noting that he built Hindu temples, employed significantly more Hindus in his imperial bureaucracy than his predecessors did, opposed bigotry against Hindus and Shia Muslims.

Decline (1707–1857)

Aurangzeb's son, Bahadur Shah I, repealed the religious policies of his father and attempted to reform the administration. "However, after his death in 1712, the Mughal dynasty sank into chaos and violent feuds. In 1719 alone, four emperors successively ascended the throne", as figureheads under the rule of the Indian Muslim Sayyid king-makers.

During the reign of Muhammad Shah (reigned 1719–1748), the empire began to break up, and vast tracts of central India passed from Mughal to Maratha hands. As the Mughals tried to suppress the independence of the Nizam in the Deccan, he encouraged the Marathas to invade central and northern India. The far-off Indian campaign of Nader Shah, who had previously reestablished Iranian suzerainty over most of West Asia, the Caucasus, and Central Asia, culminated with the Sack of Delhi and shattered the remnants of Mughal power and prestige. Many of the empire's elites now sought to control their own affairs, and broke away to form independent kingdoms. But, according to Sugata Bose and Ayesha Jalal, the Mughal Emperor continued to be the highest manifestation of sovereignty. Not only the Muslim gentry, but the Maratha, Hindu, and Sikh leaders took part in ceremonial acknowledgments of the emperor as the sovereign of India.

Meanwhile, some regional polities within the increasingly fragmented Mughal Empire, involved themselves and the state in global conflicts, leading only to defeat and loss of territory during the Carnatic Wars and the Bengal War.

The Mughal Emperor Shah Alam II (1759–1806) made futile attempts to reverse the Mughal decline but ultimately had to seek the protection of the Emir of Afghanistan, Ahmed Shah Abdali, which led to the Third Battle of Panipat between the Maratha Empire and the Afghans (led by Abdali) in 1761. In 1771, the Marathas recaptured Delhi from Afghan control and in 1784 they officially became the protectors of the emperor in Delhi, a state of affairs that continued until the Second Anglo-Maratha War. Thereafter, the British East India Company became the protectors of the Mughal dynasty in Delhi. The British East India Company took control of the former Mughal province of Bengal-Bihar in 1793 after it abolished local rule (Nizamat) that lasted until 1858, marking the beginning of British colonial era over the Indian subcontinent. By 1857 a considerable part of former Mughal India was under the East India Company's control. After a crushing defeat in the war of 1857–1858 which he nominally led, the last Mughal, Bahadur Shah Zafar, was deposed by the British East India Company and exiled in 1858. Through the Government of India Act 1858 the British Crown assumed direct control of East India Company-held territories in India in the form of the new British Raj. In 1876 the British Queen Victoria assumed the title of Empress of India.

Causes of decline 
Historians have offered numerous explanations for the rapid collapse of the Mughal Empire between 1707 and 1720, after a century of growth and prosperity. In fiscal terms, the throne lost the revenues needed to pay its chief officers, the emirs (nobles) and their entourages. The emperor lost authority, as the widely scattered imperial officers lost confidence in the central authorities, and made their own deals with local men of influence. The imperial army, bogged down in long, futile wars against the more aggressive Marathas, lost its fighting spirit. Finally came a series of violent political feuds over control of the throne. After the execution of Emperor Farrukhsiyar in 1719, local Mughal successor states took power in region after region.

Contemporary chroniclers bewailed the decay they witnessed, a theme picked up by the first British historians who wanted to underscore the need for a British-led rejuvenation.

Modern views on the decline 
Since the 1970s historians have taken multiple approaches to the decline, with little consensus on which factor was dominant. The psychological interpretations emphasise depravity in high places, excessive luxury, and increasingly narrow views that left the rulers unprepared for an external challenge. A Marxist school (led by Irfan Habib and based at Aligarh Muslim University) emphasises excessive exploitation of the peasantry by the rich, which stripped away the will and the means to support the regime. Karen Leonard has focused on the failure of the regime to work with Hindu bankers, whose financial support was increasingly needed; the bankers then helped the Maratha and the British. In a religious interpretation, some scholars argue that the Hindu powers revolted against the rule of a Muslim dynasty. Finally, other scholars argue that the very prosperity of the Empire inspired the provinces to achieve a high degree of independence, thus weakening the imperial court.

Jeffrey G. Williamson has argued that the Indian economy went through deindustrialization in the latter half of the 18th century as an indirect outcome of the collapse of the Mughal Empire, with British rule later causing further deindustrialization. According to Williamson, the decline of the Mughal Empire led to a decline in agricultural productivity, which drove up food prices, then nominal wages, and then textile prices, which led to India losing a share of the world textile market to Britain even before it had superior factory technology. Indian textiles, however, still maintained a competitive advantage over British textiles up until the 19th century.

Administration and state 

The Mughal Empire had a highly centralised, bureaucratic government, most of which was instituted during the rule of the third Mughal emperor Akbar.  The central government was headed by the Mughal emperor; immediately beneath him were four ministries. The finance/revenue ministry was responsible for controlling revenues from the empire's territories, calculating tax revenues, and using this information to distribute assignments. The ministry of the military (army/intelligence) was headed by an official titled mir bakhshi, who was in charge of military organisation, messenger service, and the mansabdari system. The ministry in charge of law/religious patronage was the responsibility of the sadr as-sudr, who appointed judges and managed charities and stipends. Another ministry was dedicated to the imperial household and public works.

Administrative divisions 
The empire was divided into suba (provinces), each of which were headed by a provincial governor called a subadar. The structure of the central government was mirrored at the provincial level; each suba had its own bakhshi, sadr as-sudr, and finance minister that reported directly to the central government rather than the subahdar. Subas were subdivided into administrative units known as sarkars, which were further divided into groups of villages known as parganas. Mughal government in the pargana consisted of a Muslim judge and local tax collector. Parganas were the basic administrative unit of the Mughal empire.

Mughal administrative divisions were not static. Territories were often rearranged and reconstituted for better administrative control, and to extend cultivation. For example, a sarkar could turn into a subah, and parganas were often transferred between sarkars. The hierarchy of division was ambiguous sometimes, as a territory could fall under multiple overlapping jurisdictions. Administrative divisions were also vague in their geography - the Mughal state did not have enough resources or authority to undertake detailed land surveys, and hence the geographical limits of these divisions were not formalised and maps not created. The Mughals instead recorded detailed statistics about each division, in order to assess the territory's capacity for revenue, on the basis of simpler land surveys.

Capitals 
The Mughals had multiple imperial capitals, established over the course of their rule. These were the cities of Agra, Delhi, Lahore, and Fatehpur Sikri. Power often shifted back and forth between these capitals. Sometimes this was necessitated by political and military demands, but shifts also occurred for ideological reasons (for example, Akbar's establishment of Fatehpur Sikri), or even simply because the cost of establishing a new capital was marginal. Situations where there were two simultaneous capitals happened multiple times in Mughal history. Certain cities also served as short-term, provincial capitals, as was the case with Aurangzeb's shift to Aurangabad in the Deccan. Kabul was the summer capital of Mughals from 1526 to 1681.

The imperial camp, used for military expeditions and royal tours, also served as a kind of mobile, "de facto" administrative capital. From the time of Akbar, Mughal camps were huge in scale, accompanied by numerous personages associated with the royal court, as well as soldiers and labourers. All administration and governance was carried out within them. The Mughal Emperors spent a significant portion of their ruling period within these camps.

After Aurangzeb, the Mughal capital definitively became the walled city of Shahjahanabad (today Old Delhi).

Law 

The Mughal Empire's legal system was context-specific and evolved over the course of the empire's rule. Being a Muslim state, the empire employed fiqh (Islamic jurisprudence) and therefore the fundamental institutions of Islamic law such as those of the qadi (judge), mufti (jurisconsult), and muhtasib (censor and market supervisor) were well-established in the Mughal Empire. However, the dispensation of justice also depended on other factors, such as administrative rules, local customs, and political convenience. This was due to Persianate influences on Mughal ideology, and the fact that the Mughal Empire governed a non-Muslim majority.

Legal ideology 
The Mughal Empire followed the Sunni Hanafi system of jurisprudence. In its early years, the empire relied on Hanafi legal references inherited from its predecessor, the Delhi Sultanate. These included the al-Hidayah (the best guidance) and the Fatawa al-Tatarkhaniyya (religious decisions of the Emire Tatarkhan). During the Mughal Empire's peak, the Fatawa 'Alamgiri was commissioned by Emperor Aurangzeb. This compendium of Hanafi law sought to serve as a central reference for the Mughal state that dealt with the specifics of the South Asian context.

The Mughal Empire also drew on Persianate notions of kingship. Particularly, this meant that the Mughal emperor was considered the supreme authority on legal affairs.

Courts of law 
Various kinds of courts existed in the Mughal empire. One such court was that of the qadi. The Mughal qadi was responsible for dispensing justice; this included settling disputes, judging people for crimes, and dealing with inheritances and orphans. The qadi also had additional importance with regards to documents, as the seal of the qadi was required to validate deeds and tax records. Qadis did not constitute a single position, but made up a hierarchy. For example, the most basic kind was the pargana (district) qadi. More prestigious positions were those of the qadi al-quddat (judge of judges) who accompanied the mobile imperial camp, and the qadi-yi lashkar (judge of the army). Qadis were usually appointed by the emperor or the sadr-us-sudr (chief of charities). The jurisdiction of the qadi was availed by Muslims and non-Muslims alike.

The jagirdar (local tax collector) was another kind of official approached, especially for high-stakes cases. Subjects of the Mughal Empire also took their grievances to the courts of superior officials who held more authority and punitive power than the local qadi. Such officials included the kotwal (local police), the faujdar (an officer controlling multiple districts and troops of soldiers), and the most powerful, the subahdar (provincial governor). In some cases, the emperor themself dispensed justice directly. Jahangir was known to have installed a "chain of justice" in the Agra fort that any aggrieved subject could shake to get the attention of the emperor and bypass the inefficacy of officials.

Self-regulating tribunals operating at the community or village level were common, but sparse documentation of them exists. For example, it is unclear how panchayats (village councils) operated in the Mughal era.

Economy 

The Mughal economy was large and prosperous. During the Mughal era, the gross domestic product (GDP) of India in 1600 was estimated at 22% of the world economy, the second largest in the world, behind only China (Ming era) but larger than Europe. By 1700, the GDP of India had risen to 24% of the world economy, the largest in the world, larger than both China (Qing era) and Western Europe. India was producing 24.5% of the world's manufacturing output up until 1750. India's GDP growth increased over the 1500-1820 period, having grown faster than over the 1-1000 and 1000-1500 periods. India's economy has been described as a form of proto-industrialization, like that of 18th-century Western Europe prior to the Industrial Revolution.

The Mughals were responsible for building an extensive road system, creating a uniform currency, and the unification of the country. The empire had an extensive road network, which was vital to the economic infrastructure, built by a public works department set up by the Mughals which designed, constructed and maintained roads linking towns and cities across the empire, making trade easier to conduct.

The main base of the empire's collective wealth was agricultural taxes, instituted by the third Mughal emperor, Akbar. These taxes, which amounted to well over half the output of a peasant cultivator, were paid in the well-regulated silver currency, and caused peasants and artisans to enter larger markets.

Coinage

The Mughals adopted and standardised the rupee (rupiya, or silver) and dam (copper) currencies introduced by Sur Emperor Sher Shah Suri during his brief rule. The currency was initially 48 dams to a single rupee in the beginning of Akbar's reign, before it later became 38 dams to a rupee in the 1580s, with the dam's value rising further in the 17th century as a result of new industrial uses for copper, such as in bronze cannons and brass utensils. The dam was initially the most common coin in Akbar's time, before being replaced by the rupee as the most common coin in succeeding reigns. The dam's value was later worth 30 to a rupee towards the end of Jahangir's reign, and then 16 to a rupee by the 1660s. The Mughals minted coins with high purity, never dropping below 96%, and without debasement until the 1720s.

Despite India having its own stocks of gold and silver, the Mughals produced minimal gold of their own, but mostly minted coins from imported bullion, as a result of the empire's strong export-driven economy, with global demand for Indian agricultural and industrial products drawing a steady stream of precious metals into India. Around 80% of Mughal India's imports were bullion, mostly silver, with major sources of imported bullion including the New World and Japan, which in turn imported large quantities of textiles and silk from the Bengal Subah province.

Labour
The historian Shireen Moosvi estimates that in terms of contributions to the Mughal economy, in the late 16th century, the primary sector contributed 52%, the secondary sector 18% and the tertiary sector 29%; the secondary sector contributed a higher percentage than in early 20th-century British India, where the secondary sector only contributed 11% to the economy. In terms of urban-rural divide, 18% of Mughal India's labour force were urban and 82% were rural, contributing 52% and 48% to the economy, respectively.

According to Stephen Broadberry and Bishnupriya Gupta, grain wages in India were comparable to England in the 16th and 17th centuries, but diverged in the 18th century when they fell to 20-40% of England's wages. This, however, is disputed by Parthasarathi and Sivramkrishna. Parthasarathi cites his estimates that grain wages for weaving and spinning in mid-18 century Bengal and South India was comparable to Britain. Similarly, Sivramkrishna analyzed agricultural surveys conducted in Mysore by Francis Buchanan during 1800–1801, arrived at estimates using a "subsistence basket" that aggregated millet income could be almost five times subsistence level, while corresponding rice income was three times that much. That could be comparable to advance part of Europe. Due to the scarcity of data, however, more research is needed before drawing any conclusion.

According to Moosvi, Mughal India had a per-capita income, in terms of wheat, 1.24% higher in the late 16th century than British India did in the early 20th century. This income, however, would have to be revised downwards if manufactured goods, like clothing, would be considered. Compared to food per-capita, expenditure on clothing was much smaller though, so relative income between 1595 and 1596 should be comparable to 1901–1910. However, in a system where wealth was hoarded by elites, wages were depressed for manual labour. In Mughal India, there was a generally tolerant attitude towards manual labourers, with some religious cults in northern India proudly asserting a high status for manual labour. While slavery also existed, it was limited largely to household servants.

Agriculture
Indian agricultural production increased under the Mughal Empire. A variety of crops were grown, including food crops such as wheat, rice, and barley, and non-food cash crops such as cotton, indigo and opium. By the mid-17th century, Indian cultivators begun to extensively grow two new crops from the Americas, maize and tobacco.

The Mughal administration emphasised agrarian reform, which began under the non-Mughal emperor Sher Shah Suri, the work of which Akbar adopted and furthered with more reforms. The civil administration was organised in a hierarchical manner on the basis of merit, with promotions based on performance. The Mughal government funded the building of irrigation systems across the empire, which produced much higher crop yields and increased the net revenue base, leading to increased agricultural production.

A major Mughal reform introduced by Akbar was a new land revenue system called zabt. He replaced the tribute system, previously common in India and used by Tokugawa Japan at the time, with a monetary tax system based on a uniform currency. The revenue system was biased in favour of higher value cash crops such as cotton, indigo, sugar cane, tree-crops, and opium, providing state incentives to grow cash crops, in addition to rising market demand. Under the zabt system, the Mughals also conducted extensive cadastral surveying to assess the area of land under plow cultivation, with the Mughal state encouraging greater land cultivation by offering tax-free periods to those who brought new land under cultivation. The expansion of agriculture and cultivation continued under later Mughal emperors including Aurangzeb, whose 1665 firman edict stated: "the entire elevated attention and desires of the Emperor are devoted to the increase in the population and cultivation of the Empire and the welfare of the whole peasantry and the entire people."

Mughal agriculture was in some ways advanced compared to European agriculture at the time, exemplified by the common use of the seed drill among Indian peasants before its adoption in Europe. While the average peasant across the world was only skilled in growing very few crops, the average Indian peasant was skilled in growing a wide variety of food and non-food crops, increasing their productivity. Indian peasants were also quick to adapt to profitable new crops, such as maize and tobacco from the New World being rapidly adopted and widely cultivated across Mughal India between 1600 and 1650. Bengali farmers rapidly learned techniques of mulberry cultivation and sericulture, establishing Bengal Subah as a major silk-producing region of the world. Sugar mills appeared in India shortly before the Mughal era. Evidence for the use of a draw bar for sugar-milling appears at Delhi in 1540, but may also date back earlier, and was mainly used in the northern Indian subcontinent. Geared sugar rolling mills first appeared in Mughal India, using the principle of rollers as well as worm gearing, by the 17th century.

According to economic historian Immanuel Wallerstein, citing evidence from Irfan Habib, Percival Spear, and Ashok Desai, per-capita agricultural output and standards of consumption in 17th-century Mughal India were probably higher than in 17th-century Europe and certainly higher than early 20th-century British India. The increased agricultural productivity led to lower food prices. In turn, this benefited the Indian textile industry. Compared to Britain, the price of grain was about one-half in South India and one-third in Bengal, in terms of silver coinage. This resulted in lower silver coin prices for Indian textiles, giving them a price advantage in global markets.

Industrial manufacturing
Up until 1750, India produced about 25% of the world's industrial output. Manufactured goods and cash crops from the Mughal Empire were sold throughout the world. Key industries included textiles, shipbuilding, and steel. Processed products included cotton textiles, yarns, thread, silk, jute products, metalware, and foods such as sugar, oils and butter. The growth of manufacturing industries in the Indian subcontinent during the Mughal era in the 17th–18th centuries has been referred to as a form of proto-industrialization, similar to 18th-century Western Europe prior to the Industrial Revolution.

In early modern Europe, there was significant demand for products from Mughal India, particularly cotton textiles, as well as goods such as spices, peppers, indigo, silks, and saltpeter (for use in munitions). European fashion, for example, became increasingly dependent on Mughal Indian textiles and silks. From the late 17th century to the early 18th century, Mughal India accounted for 95% of British imports from Asia, and the Bengal Subah province alone accounted for 40% of Dutch imports from Asia. In contrast, there was very little demand for European goods in Mughal India, which was largely self-sufficient, thus Europeans had very little to offer, except for some woolens, unprocessed metals and a few luxury items. The trade imbalance caused Europeans to export large quantities of gold and silver to Mughal India in order to pay for South Asian imports. Indian goods, especially those from Bengal, were also exported in large quantities to other Asian markets, such as Indonesia and Japan.

Textile industry

The largest manufacturing industry in the Mughal Empire was textile manufacturing, particularly cotton textile manufacturing, which included the production of piece goods, calicos, and muslins, available unbleached and in a variety of colours. The cotton textile industry was responsible for a large part of the empire's international trade. India had a 25% share of the global textile trade in the early 18th century. Indian cotton textiles were the most important manufactured goods in world trade in the 18th century, consumed across the world from the Americas to Japan. By the early 18th century, Mughal Indian textiles were clothing people across the Indian subcontinent, Southeast Asia, Europe, the Americas, Africa, and the Middle East. The most important centre of cotton production was the Bengal province, particularly around its capital city of Dhaka.

Bengal accounted for more than 50% of textiles and around 80% of silks imported by the Dutch from Asia, Bengali silk and cotton textiles were exported in large quantities to Europe, Indonesia, and Japan, and Bengali muslin textiles from Dhaka were sold in Central Asia, where they were known as "Dhaka textiles". Indian textiles dominated the Indian Ocean trade for centuries, were sold in the Atlantic Ocean trade, and had a 38% share of the West African trade in the early 18th century, while Indian calicos were a major force in Europe, and Indian textiles accounted for 20% of total English trade with Southern Europe in the early 18th century.

The worm gear roller cotton gin, which was invented in India during the early Delhi Sultanate era of the 13th–14th centuries, came into use in the Mughal Empire sometime around the 16th century, and is still used in India through to the present day. Another innovation, the incorporation of the crank handle in the cotton gin, first appeared in India sometime during the late Delhi Sultanate or the early Mughal Empire. The production of cotton, which may have largely been spun in the villages and then taken to towns in the form of yarn to be woven into cloth textiles, was advanced by the diffusion of the spinning wheel across India shortly before the Mughal era, lowering the costs of yarn and helping to increase demand for cotton. The diffusion of the spinning wheel, and the incorporation of the worm gear and crank handle into the roller cotton gin led to greatly expanded Indian cotton textile production during the Mughal era.

 Once, the Mughal emperor Akbar asked his courtiers, which was the most beautiful flower. Some said rose, from whose petals were distilled the precious ittar, others, the lotus, glory of every Indian village. But Birbal said, “The cotton boll”. There was a scornful laughter and Akbar asked for an explanation. Birbal said, “Your Majesty, from the cotton boll comes the fine fabric prized by merchants across the seas that has made your empire famous throughout the world. The perfume of your fame far exceeds the scent of roses and jasmine. That is why I say the cotton boll is the most beautiful flower.

Shipbuilding industry

Mughal India had a large shipbuilding industry, which was also largely centred in the Bengal province. Economic historian Indrajit Ray estimates shipbuilding output of Bengal during the sixteenth and seventeenth centuries at 223,250 tons annually, compared with 23,061 tons produced in nineteen colonies in North America from 1769 to 1771. He also assesses ship repairing as very advanced in Bengal.

Indian shipbuilding, particularly in Bengal, was advanced compared to European shipbuilding at the time, with Indians selling ships to European firms. An important innovation in shipbuilding was the introduction of a flushed deck design in Bengal rice ships, resulting in hulls that were stronger and less prone to leak than the structurally weak hulls of traditional European ships built with a stepped deck design. The British East India Company later duplicated the flushed deck and hull designs of Bengal rice ships in the 1760s, leading to significant improvements in seaworthiness and navigation for European ships during the Industrial Revolution.

Bengal Subah

The Bengal Subah province was especially prosperous from the time of its takeover by the Mughals in 1590 until the British East India Company seized control in 1757. Historian C. A. Bayly wrote that it was probably the Mughal Empire's wealthiest province. Domestically, much of India depended on Bengali products such as rice, silks and cotton textiles. Overseas, Europeans depended on Bengali products such as cotton textiles, silks, and opium; Bengal accounted for 40% of Dutch imports from Asia, for example, including more than 50% of textiles and around 80% of silks. From Bengal, saltpeter was also shipped to Europe, opium was sold in Indonesia, raw silk was exported to Japan and the Netherlands, and cotton and silk textiles were exported to Europe, Indonesia and Japan.
Akbar played a key role in establishing Bengal as a leading economic centre, as he began transforming many of the jungles there into farms. As soon as he conquered the region, he brought tools and men to clear jungles in order to expand cultivation and brought Sufis to open the jungles to farming. Bengal was later described as the Paradise of Nations by Mughal emperors. The Mughals introduced agrarian reforms, including the modern Bengali calendar. The calendar played a vital role in developing and organising harvests, tax collection and Bengali culture in general, including the New Year and Autumn festivals. The province was a leading producer of grains, salt, fruits, liquors and wines, precious metals and ornaments. Its handloom industry flourished under royal warrants, making the region a hub of the worldwide muslin trade, which peaked in the 17th and 18th centuries. The provincial capital Dhaka became the commercial capital of the empire. The Mughals expanded cultivated land in the Bengal delta under the leadership of Sufis, which consolidated the foundation of Bengali Muslim society.

After 150 years of rule by Mughal viceroys, Bengal gained semi-independence as a dominion under the Nawab of Bengal in 1717. The Nawabs permitted European companies to set up trading posts across the region, including firms from Britain, France, the Netherlands, Denmark, Portugal and Austria. An Armenian community dominated banking and shipping in major cities and towns. The Europeans regarded Bengal as the richest place for trade. By the late 18th century, the British displaced the Mughal ruling class in Bengal.

Demographics

Population 
India's population growth accelerated under the Mughal Empire, with an unprecedented economic and demographic upsurge which boosted the Indian population by 60% to 253% in 200 years during 1500–1700. The Indian population had a faster growth during the Mughal era than at any known point in Indian history prior to the Mughal era. By the time of Aurangzeb's reign, there were a total of 455,698 villages in the Mughal Empire.

The following table gives population estimates for the Mughal Empire, compared to the total population of India, including the regions of modern Pakistan and Bangladesh, and compared to the world population:

Urbanization 
According to Irfan Habib Cities and towns boomed under the Mughal Empire, which had a relatively high degree of urbanization for its time, with 15% of its population living in urban centres. This was higher than the percentage of the urban population in contemporary Europe at the time and higher than that of British India in the 19th century; the level of urbanization in Europe did not reach 15% until the 19th century.

Under Akbar's reign in 1600, the Mughal Empire's urban population was up to 17 million people, 15% of the empire's total population. This was larger than the entire urban population in Europe at the time, and even a century later in 1700, the urban population of England, Scotland and Wales did not exceed 13% of its total population, while British India had an urban population that was under 13% of its total population in 1800 and 9% in 1881, a decline from the earlier Mughal era. By 1700, Mughal India had an urban population of 23 million people, larger than British India's urban population of 22.3 million in 1871.

Those estimates were criticised by Tim Dyson, who consider them exaggerations. According to Dyson urbanization of Mughal empire was less than 9%.

The historian Nizamuddin Ahmad (1551–1621) reported that, under Akbar's reign, there were 120 large cities and 3200 townships. A number of cities in India had a population between a quarter-million and half-million people, with larger cities including Agra (in Agra Subah) with up to 800,000 people, Lahore (in Lahore Subah) with up to 700,000 people, Dhaka (in Bengal Subah) with over 1 million people, and Delhi (in Delhi Subah) with over 600,000 people.

Cities acted as markets for the sale of goods, and provided homes for a variety of merchants, traders, shopkeepers, artisans, moneylenders, weavers, craftspeople, officials, and religious figures. However, a number of cities were military and political centres, rather than manufacturing or commerce centres.

Culture 

The Mughal Empire was definitive in the early-modern and modern periods of South Asian history, with its legacy in India, Pakistan, Bangladesh and Afghanistan seen in cultural contributions such as:

 Centralised imperial rule that consolidated the smaller polities of South Asia.
 The amalgamation of Persian art and literature with Indian art.

 The development of Mughlai cuisine, an amalgamation of South Asian, Iranian and Central Asian culinary styles.
 The development of Mughal clothing, jewelry and fashion, utilizing richly decorated fabrics such as muslin, silk, brocade and velvet.
 The standardization of the Hindustani language, and thus the development of Hindi and Urdu.
 The introduction of sophisticated Iranian-style waterworks and horticulture through Mughal gardening.
 The introduction of Turkish baths into the Indian subcontinent.
 The evolution and refinement of Mughal and Indian architecture and in turn, the development of later Rajput and Sikh palatial architecture. A famous Mughal landmark is the Taj Mahal.
 The development of the Pehlwani style of Indian wrestling, a combination of Indian malla-yuddha and Persian varzesh-e bastani.
 The construction of Maktab schools, where youth were taught the Quran and Islamic law such as the Fatawa 'Alamgiri in their indigenous languages.
 The development of Hindustani classical music, and instruments such as the sitar.

Architecture 

The Mughals made a major contribution to the Indian subcontinent with the development of their unique Indo-Persian architecture. Many monuments were built during the Mughal era by the Muslim emperors, especially Shah Jahan, including the Taj Mahal—a UNESCO World Heritage Site considered "the jewel of Muslim art in India and one of the universally admired masterpieces of the world's heritage", attracting 7–8 million unique visitors a year. The palaces, tombs, gardens and forts built by the dynasty stand today in Agra, Aurangabad, Delhi, Dhaka, Fatehpur Sikri, Jaipur, Lahore, Kabul, Sheikhupura, and many other cities of India, Pakistan, Afghanistan, and Bangladesh, such as:

Art and literature 

The Mughal artistic tradition, mainly expressed in painted miniatures, as well as small luxury objects, was eclectic, borrowing from Iranian, Indian, Chinese and Renaissance European stylistic and thematic elements. Mughal emperors often took in Iranian bookbinders, illustrators, painters and calligraphers from the Safavid court due to the commonalities of their Timurid styles, and due to the Mughal affinity for Iranian art and calligraphy. Miniatures commissioned by the Mughal emperors initially focused on large projects illustrating books with eventful historical scenes and court life, but later included more single images for albums, with portraits and animal paintings displaying a profound appreciation for the serenity and beauty of the natural world. For example, Emperor Jahangir commissioned brilliant artists such as Ustad Mansur to realistically portray unusual flora and fauna throughout the empire.

The literary works Akbar and Jahangir ordered to be illustrated ranged from epics like the Razmnama (a Persian translation of the Hindu epic, the Mahabharata) to historical memoirs or biographies of the dynasty such as the Baburnama and Akbarnama, and Tuzk-e-Jahangiri. Richly-finished albums (muraqqa) decorated with calligraphy and artistic scenes were mounted onto pages with decorative borders and then bound with covers of stamped and gilded or painted and lacquered leather. Aurangzeb (1658–1707) was never an enthusiastic patron of painting, largely for religious reasons, and took a turn away from the pomp and ceremonial of the court around 1668, after which he probably commissioned no more paintings.

Language 

According to Qazvini, by the time of Shah Jahan, the emperor was only familiar with a few Turki words and showed little interest in the study of the language as a child. Though the Mughals were of Turko-Mongol origin, their reign enacted the revival and height of the Persian language in the Indian subcontinent. Accompanied by literary patronage was the institutionalisation of Persian as official and courtly language; this led to Persian reaching nearly the status of a first language for many inhabitants of Mughal India. Muzaffar Alam argues that the Mughals used Persian purposefully as the vehicle of an overarching Indo-Persian political culture, to unite their diverse empire. Persian had a profound impact on the languages of South Asia; one such language, today known as Urdu, developed in the imperial capital of Delhi in the late Mughal era. It began to be used as a literary language in the Mughal court from the reign of Shah Alam II, who described it as the language of his dastans, and replaced Persian as the language of the Muslim elite.

Military

Gunpowder warfare 

Mughal India was one of the three Islamic gunpowder empires, along with the Ottoman Empire and Safavid Persia. By the time he was invited by Lodi governor of Lahore, Daulat Khan, to support his rebellion against Lodi Sultan Ibrahim Khan, Babur was familiar with gunpowder firearms and field artillery, and a method for deploying them. Babur had employed Ottoman expert Ustad Ali Quli, who showed Babur the standard Ottoman formation—artillery and firearm-equipped infantry protected by wagons in the centre and the mounted archers on both wings. Babur used this formation at the First Battle of Panipat in 1526, where the Afghan and Rajput forces loyal to the Delhi Sultanate, though superior in numbers but without the gunpowder weapons, were defeated. The decisive victory of the Timurid forces is one reason opponents rarely met Mughal princes in pitched battle over the course of the empire's history. In India, guns made of bronze were recovered from Calicut (1504) and Diu (1533).

Fathullah Shirazi (c. 1582), a Persian polymath and mechanical engineer who worked for Akbar, developed an early multi gun shot. As opposed to the polybolos and repeating crossbows used earlier in ancient Greece and China, respectively, Shirazi's rapid-firing gun had multiple gun barrels that fired hand cannons loaded with gunpowder. It may be considered a version of a volley gun.

By the 17th century, Indians were manufacturing a diverse variety of firearms; large guns in particular, became visible in Tanjore, Dacca, Bijapur and Murshidabad.

Rocketry and explosives

In the sixteenth century, Akbar was the first to initiate and use metal cylinder rockets known as bans, particularly against war elephants, during the Battle of Sanbal. In 1657, the Mughal Army used rockets during the Siege of Bidar. Prince Aurangzeb's forces discharged rockets and grenades while scaling the walls. Sidi Marjan was mortally wounded when a rocket struck his large gunpowder depot, and after twenty-seven days of hard fighting Bidar was captured by the Mughals.

In A History of Greek Fire and Gunpowder, James Riddick Partington described Indian rockets and explosive mines:

The Indian war rockets were formidable weapons before such rockets were used in Europe. They had bam-boo rods, a rocket-body lashed to the rod, and iron points. They were directed at the target and fired by lighting the fuse, but the trajectory was rather erratic. The use of mines and counter-mines with explosive charges of gunpowder is mentioned for the times of Akbar and Jahangir.

Later, the Mysorean rockets were upgraded versions of Mughal rockets used during the Siege of Jinji by the progeny of the Nawab of Arcot. Hyder Ali's father Fatah Muhammad the constable at Budikote, commanded a corps consisting of 50 rocketmen (Cushoon) for the Nawab of Arcot. Hyder Ali realised the importance of rockets and introduced advanced versions of metal cylinder rockets. These rockets turned fortunes in favour of the Sultanate of Mysore during the Second Anglo-Mysore War, particularly during the Battle of Pollilur. In turn, the Mysorean rockets were the basis for the Congreve rockets, which Britain deployed in the Napoleonic Wars against France and the War of 1812 against the United States.

Science

Astronomy 

While there appears to have been little concern for theoretical astronomy, Mughal astronomers made advances in observational astronomy and produced nearly a hundred Zij treatises. Humayun built a personal observatory near Delhi; Jahangir and Shah Jahan were also intending to build observatories, but were unable to do so. The astronomical instruments and observational techniques used at the Mughal observatories were mainly derived from Islamic astronomy. In the 17th century, the Mughal Empire saw a synthesis between Islamic and Hindu astronomy, where Islamic observational instruments were combined with Hindu computational techniques.

During the decline of the Mughal Empire, the Hindu king Jai Singh II of Amber continued the work of Mughal astronomy. In the early 18th century, he built several large observatories called Yantra Mandirs, in order to rival Ulugh Beg's Samarkand observatory, and in order to improve on the earlier Hindu computations in the Siddhantas and Islamic observations in Zij-i-Sultani. The instruments he used were influenced by Islamic astronomy, while the computational techniques were derived from Hindu astronomy.

Chemistry 

Sake Dean Mahomed had learned much of Mughal chemistry and understood the techniques used to produce various alkali and soaps to produce shampoo. He was also a notable writer who described the Mughal Emperor Shah Alam II and the cities of Allahabad and Delhi in rich detail and also made note of the glories of the Mughal Empire.

In Britain, Sake Dean Mahomed was appointed as shampooing surgeon to both Kings George IV and William IV.

Metallurgy 

One of the most remarkable astronomical instruments invented in Mughal India is the lost-wax cast, hollow, seamless, celestial globe. It was invented in Kashmir by Ali Kashmiri ibn Luqman in 998 AH (1589–90 CE), and twenty other such globes were later produced in Lahore and Kashmir during the Mughal Empire. Before they were rediscovered in the 1980s, it was believed by modern metallurgists to be technically impossible to produce hollow metal globes without any seams.
A 17th century celestial globe was also made by Diya’ ad-din Muhammad in Lahore, 1668 (now in Pakistan). It is now housed at the National Museum of Scotland.

List of Mughal Emperors

See also 
 Mughal dynasty
 Flags of the Mughal Empire
 Mughal emperors
 List of Mongol states
 Mansabdar
 Mughal people
 Mughal Harem
 Mughal weapons
 Mughal architecture
 Mughlai cuisine
 Mughal-Mongol genealogy
 Islam in South Asia

References

Footnotes

Citations

Further reading 

 Alam, Muzaffar. Crisis of Empire in Mughal North India: Awadh & the Punjab, 1707–48 (1988)
 , on the causes of its collapse
 
 Black, Jeremy. "The Mughals Strike Twice", History Today (April 2012) 62#4 pp. 22–26. full text online
 
 
 Dale, Stephen F. The Muslim Empires of the Ottomans, Safavids and Mughals (Cambridge U.P. 2009)
 
 , on Akbar and his brother
 Gommans; Jos. Mughal Warfare: Indian Frontiers and Highroads to Empire, 1500–1700 (Routledge, 2002) online edition
 Gordon, S. The New Cambridge History of India, II, 4: The Marathas 1600–1818 (Cambridge, 1993).
 Habib, Irfan. Atlas of the Mughal Empire: Political and Economic Maps (1982).
 
 
 
 
 
 
 
 
 Srivastava, Ashirbadi Lal. The Mughul Empire, 1526–1803 (1952) online.

Culture 
 Berinstain, V. Mughal India: Splendour of the Peacock Throne (London, 1998).
 Busch, Allison. Poetry of Kings: The Classical Hindi Literature of Mughal India (2011) excerpt and text search
 
 
 Schimmel, Annemarie. The Empire of the Great Mughals: History, Art and Culture (Reaktion 2006)

Society and economy 
 
 Habib, Irfan. Atlas of the Mughal Empire: Political and Economic Maps (1982).
 Habib, Irfan. Agrarian System of Mughal India (1963, revised edition 1999).
 
 
 Rothermund, Dietmar. An Economic History of India: From Pre-Colonial Times to 1991 (1993)

Primary sources 
 
 Hiro, Dilip, ed, Journal of Emperor Babur (Penguin Classics 2007)
 The Baburnama: Memoirs of Babur, Prince and Emperor ed. by W.M. Thackston Jr. (2002); this was the first autobiography in Islamic literature
 Jackson, A.V. et al., eds. History of India (1907) v. 9. Historic accounts of India by foreign travellers, classic, oriental, and occidental, by A.V.W. Jackson online edition

Older histories 
 Elliot, Sir H.M., Edited by Dowson, John. The History of India, as Told by Its Own Historians. The Muhammadan Period; published by London Trubner Company 1867–1877. (Online Copy at Packard Humanities Institute – Other Persian Texts in Translation; historical books: Author List and Title List)

External links 

 Mughal India an interactive experience from the British Museum
 The Mughal Empire, BBC Radio 4 discussion with Sanjay Subrahmanyam, Susan Stronge & Chandrika Kaul (In Our Time, 26 February 2004)
 Sunil Khilnani's "Akbar," From BBC Radio 4's Incarnations: India in 50 Lives.

 
States and territories established in 1526
States and territories disestablished in 1857
Empires and kingdoms of Afghanistan
Medieval India
Mongol states
1526 establishments in the Mughal Empire
1857 disestablishments in the Mughal Empire
History of Pakistan